Hugh Hunt (March 8, 1902 – September 1, 1988) was an American set decorator. He won two Academy Awards and was nominated for eleven more in the category Best Art Direction.

Selected filmography
Hunt won two Academy Awards for Best Art Direction and was nominated for eleven more:
Won
 Ben-Hur (1959)
 Julius Caesar (1953)
Nominated
 Mister Buddwing (1966)
 The Unsinkable Molly Brown (1964)
 Twilight of Honor (1963)
 Mutiny on the Bounty (1962)
 Cimarron (1960)
 Raintree County (1957)
 I'll Cry Tomorrow (1955)
 Quo Vadis (1951)
 The Red Danube (1949)
 The Picture of Dorian Gray (1945)
 Madame Curie (1943)

References

External links

1902 births
1988 deaths
American set decorators
Best Art Direction Academy Award winners
People from Memphis, Tennessee